Hopalong Cassidy is a fictional cowboy hero created in 1904 by the author Clarence E. Mulford, who wrote a series of short stories and novels based on the character. Mulford portrayed the character as rude, dangerous, and rough-talking. He was shot in the leg during a gun fight which caused him to walk with a little "hop", hence the nickname.

From the 1930s to the 1950s, the character became indelibly associated with actor William Boyd, who portrayed Cassidy first in a series of sixty-six films from 1935 to 1948, then in children-oriented radio and TV series, both of which lasted until 1952. Boyd's portrayal of Cassidy had little in common with the literary character, being instead a clean-cut, sarsaparilla-drinking hero who never shot first. The plots of the film, radio and TV series were generally not taken from Mulford's writings.

At the peak of the character's popularity in the early 1950s, he spawned enormous amounts of merchandise, as well as a comic strip, additional novels by Louis L'Amour (writing as Tex Burns), and even a short-lived amusement park, "Hoppyland", in Venice, Los Angeles.

In literature
Clarence E. Mulford wrote the first Hopalong Cassidy short story in 1904 while living in Fryeburg, Maine. He wrote the first novel, Bar-20 (named after Cassidy's ranch) in 1906. He wrote 28 Hopalong Cassidy novels in all, with the last one, Hopalong Cassidy Serves a Writ, being published in 1941. Not all of these novels focused on the Cassidy character; some focused on other characters in and around Bar-20.

In 1950, while the character was undergoing a surge in popularity, then-aspiring author Louis L'Amour was commissioned to write four additional Hopalong Cassidy novels, this time with a characterization matching William Boyd's portrayal, rather than Mulford's writings. L'Amour wrote the novels under the pseudonym Tex Burns. Although they were his first published novels, he was unhappy with the assignment, since he preferred the original character, and publicly denied authorship of the novels for the rest of his life.

In 2005, author Susie Coffman published Follow Your Stars, new stories starring the character. In three of these stories, Coffman wrote the wife of actor William Boyd into the stories.

Film history

As portrayed on the screen, white-haired Bill "Hopalong" Cassidy was usually clad strikingly in black (including his hat, an exception to the Western film stereotype that only villains wore black hats). He was reserved and well spoken, with a sense of fair play. He was often called upon to intercede when dishonest characters took advantage of honest citizens. "Hoppy" and his white horse, Topper, usually traveled through the West with two companions: one young and trouble-prone with a weakness for damsels in distress, the other older, comically awkward and outspoken.

The juvenile lead was successively played by James Ellison, Russell Hayden, George Reeves, Rand Brooks, and Jimmy Rogers. George Hayes (later to become known as "Gabby" Hayes) originally played Cassidy's grizzled sidekick, Windy Halliday. After Hayes left the series because of a salary dispute with producer Harry Sherman, he was replaced by the comedian Britt Wood as Speedy McGinnis and finally by the veteran movie comedian Andy Clyde as California Carlson. Clyde, the most durable of the sidekicks, remained with the series until it ended. A few actors of future prominence appeared in Cassidy films, notably Robert Mitchum, who appeared in seven films at the beginning of his career.

The 66 Hopalong Cassidy pictures were filmed by independent producers who released the films through the studios. The first "Hoppies", as the films were known, were distributed by Paramount Pictures to favorable returns, and United Artists was the distributor after Paramount. They were noted for fast action and outdoor photography (usually by Russell Harlan). Harry Sherman wanted to make more ambitious films and tried to cancel the Cassidy series, but popular demand forced Sherman back into production, this time for United Artists. Sherman gave up the series in 1944, but Boyd wanted to keep it going, and ended up co-producing 12 more films himself, from 1946 to 1948, now with lower budgets. The film series finally ended as "B" westerns were being phased out.

In the first film, Hopalong Cassidy (then spelled "Hop-along") got his name after being shot in the leg. Hopalong's "drink of choice" was the nonalcoholic sarsaparilla.

Television

Boyd thought Hopalong Cassidy might have a future in television, so he sold or mortgaged most of what he owned to buy the character rights from Mulford and the backlog of movies from Sherman, spending $350,000 to obtain the rights to his old films. He then approached the fledgling NBC network to air the films. The initial broadcasts were so successful that NBC could not wait for a television series to be produced and edited the feature films to broadcast length. On June 24, 1949, Hopalong Cassidy became the first network Western television series.

The series and character were so popular that Hopalong Cassidy was featured on the cover of national magazines such as Look, Life, and Time. Boyd earned millions as Hopalong ($800,000 in 1950 alone), mostly from merchandise licensing and endorsement deals. In 1950, Hopalong Cassidy was featured on the first lunchbox to bear an image, causing sales of Aladdin Industries lunch boxes to jump from 50,000 units to 600,000 units per year. In 1950, more than 100 companies manufactured $70 million of Hopalong Cassidy products, including children's dinnerware, pillows, roller skates, soap, wristwatches (made by Timex), and jackknives.

There was a new demand for Hopalong Cassidy features in movie theaters, and Boyd licensed reissue distributor Film Classics to make new film prints and advertising accessories. Another 1950 enterprise saw the home-movie company Castle Films manufacturing condensed versions of the Paramount films for 16 mm and 8 mm film projectors; they were sold through 1966.

Thanks to the earlier series which showed edited versions of his films, Boyd began work on a separate series of half-hour westerns made especially for television; Edgar Buchanan was his new sidekick, Red Connors (a character from the original stories and a few of the early films). The theme music for the television show was written by Nacio Herb Brown (music) and L. Wolfe Gilbert (lyrics). The show ranked number 7 in the 1949 Nielsen ratings, number 9 in the 1950–1951 season and number 28 in 1951–1952. The success of the show and tie-ins inspired juvenile television westerns such as The Range Rider, Tales of the Texas Rangers, Annie Oakley, The Gene Autry Show, and The Roy Rogers Show.

Radio

The success of the television series made Boyd a star. The Mutual Broadcasting System began broadcasting a radio version, with Andy Clyde as the sidekick (except for episodes 28 to 53 of the 105 episode series, when, for reasons unknown, he was replaced by several different radio actors). The show was syndicated from 1948 to 1950, then began broadcast on Mutual on January 1, 1950. At the end of September, the show moved to CBS Radio, where it ran until 1952.

In other media

Comic books/comics strips 
Fawcett Comics published a Hopalong Cassidy comic book one-shot in 1943, followed by an ongoing series from 1946–1953 (numbered #1 through 85), when the company ceased publishing. DC Comics took over the title in 1954 with issue #86, publishing it until issue #135, in 1959.

Mirror Enterprises Syndicate distributed a Hopalong Cassidy comic strip starting in 1949; it was bought out by King Features in 1951, running until 1955. The strip was drawn by Dan Spiegle, with scripts by Royal King Cole.

Record readers 
Beginning in 1950, Capitol Records released a series of Hopalong Cassidy "record readers" featuring William Boyd and music by Billy May, produced by Alan W. Livingston.

Hoppyland
On May 26, 1951, an amusement park named Hoppyland opened in the Venice section of Los Angeles. This was an expansion and retheming of Venice Lake Park (opened the previous year) as Boyd became an investor. Standing on  it included a roller coaster, miniature railroads, pony rides, boat ride, Ferris wheel, carousel, and other thrill rides along with picnic grounds and recreational facilities. Despite Boyd's regular appearances as Hoppy at the park, it was not a success and shut down in 1954.

Museums 
There have been museum displays of Hopalong Cassidy. The major display is at the Autry National Center at Griffith Park in Los Angeles, California. Fifteen miles east of Wichita, Kansas, at the Prairie Rose Chuckwagon Supper was the Hopalong Cassidy Museum. The museum and its contents were auctioned on August 24, 2007, owing to the failure of its parent company, Wild West World.

A "Hoppy Museum" consisting of a collection of products endorsed by William Boyd is located at Scott's 10th Street Antique Mall in Cambridge, Ohio.

Topper's saddle is on display at Twin Cities South Trailers, a horse trailer dealership in Pilot Point Texas.

Cultural references
In the closing chapter of F. Scott Fitzgerald's 1925 novel The Great Gatsby, the title character's father, Henry C. Gatz, explaining his son's early character, is described "...pull[ing] from his pocket a ragged old copy of a book called Hopalong Cassidy. 'Look here, this is a book he had when he was a boy. It just shows you.'"

The 1951 song "It's Beginning to Look a Lot Like Christmas" includes a reference to "Hopalong boots" as a holiday gift desired by children.  Hopalong Cassidy is also referred to in Buddy Alan and Don Rich's 1970 top twenty hit, "Cowboy Convention". In 1973, fellow film cowboy Roy Rogers released a nostalgic ballad called "Hoppy, Gene and Me".

The 1951 comedy film Callaway Went Thataway is a spoof of the then-ongoing Hopalong Cassidy craze.

In the 1985 film “Fletch” actor Chevy Chase jokes that he was close to buying a house until he learned that Hopalong Cassidy killed himself there.  “Very Weird”.  

In 2009, the US Postal Service selected Cassidy as one of the characters featured on a series of stamps depicting early TV characters.

References

Further reading
Caro, Joseph, Collector's Guide to Hopalong Cassidy Memorabilia (1991, out of print)
Caro, Joseph, Hopalong Cassidy Collectibles. CCN Publishing (1998) – 1,300 color photos and item conditions
Hall, Roger, Following the Stars: Music and Memories of Hopalong Cassidy. Stoughton: PineTree Press (2005)
Perham, Joseph A., Reflections on Hopalong Cassidy: A Study of Clarence E. Mulford, unplublished M.A. thesis, University of Maine (1966)
Spiegle, Dan and Royal King Cole, Paragon Publications Presents Clarence E. Mulford's Hopalong Cassidy and the Five Men of Evil. A.C. Comics (Jan. 1993)  (comic strip reprint collection)

External links

 
 Hopalong Cassidy Music

Western (genre) novels
Western (genre) comics
Western (genre) short stories
1904 American novels
American novels adapted into films
American novels adapted into television shows
DC Comics titles
Fawcett Comics titles
Cassidy, Hopalong
Cassidy, Hopalong
Novels adapted into comics
Novels adapted into radio programs
Cassidy, Hopalong
Cassidy, Hopalong